Kirn is a surname. Notable people with the surname include:

Hans Kirn (1920–2007), German Luftwaffe pilot
Louis Joseph Kirn, United States Navy admiral
Otto Kirn (1857–1911), German theologian
Roman Kirn, Permanent Representative of Slovenia to the United Nations
Walter Kirn, American novelist and critic